The AS-90 ("Artillery System for the 1990s"), known officially as Gun Equipment 155 mm L131, is an armoured self-propelled artillery weapon used by the British Army.

The maximum rate of fire is 3 rounds in 10 seconds (burst); 6 per minute for 3 minutes (intense); and 2 per minute for 60 minutes (sustained).

History
AS-90 was designed and built by the Armaments division of Vickers Shipbuilding and Engineering (VSEL). Between 1992 and 1995, VSEL supplied 179 vehicles at a cost of £300 million ($480 million). The AS-90 was first deployed by the British Army in 1993. The AS-90s were acquired to re-equip six of the eight self-propelled field artillery regiments (each of 24 guns) in the I (BR) Corps, replacing the 105 mm FV433 Abbot and older M109 155 mm Self Propelled Gun and FH70 towed howitzer.  In 1999, VSEL became a part of BAE Systems.

In 1999, Marconi Electronic Systems was contracted to upgrade British Army AS-90s to include a 52 calibre gun in order to increase the range of the artillery. Critical to the programme was a bi-modular charge system from Somchem of South Africa (selected after extensive trials of ammunition from many suppliers), which offered greatly reduced barrel wear. However, this ammunition failed to meet the requirement for insensitive munitions and the project was terminated.

It remains in UK service and equips three field regiments supporting armoured infantry brigades for the foreseeable future. In 2008, there were 134 AS-90 in service further reduced to 117 by 2015. In 2008 and 2009, a capability enhancement programme primarily upgraded AS-90's electronic system.

The initial expected out-of-service date for the AS-90 had been 2030, but this was later delayed to 2032 with a replacement planned to enter service in 2029.

On 24 April 2022, the Daily Express reported that AS-90s and 45,000 artillery rounds would be sent to Ukraine but that was subsequently denied by Defence Secretary Ben Wallace. On 14 January 2023, British Prime Minister Rishi Sunak announced that Britain would send 30 AS-90 to Ukraine, amongst other supplies (including 14 Challenger 2 tanks), for use in the ongoing Russo-Ukrainian War.

To fill the gap in British Army artillery left buy the donation, the UK government announced they were buying 14 Archer Artillery Systems in March 2023. The deal was negotiated in just eight weeks as part of the urgent operational requirements procurement process; the first vehicles are to be fully operational by April 2024. The purchase will fill a hole in capabilities until a new system is decided upon as part of the Mobile Fires Platform program, which the Archer is one of the competitors in.

Development
AS-90 started in the mid-1980s as a private venture on the gamble that the tri-national SP70 would fail. When this did occur, the Ministry of Defence (MoD) issued a cardinal point specification on one page for a new 155 mm self-propelled gun. The MoD was also required to consider the US "Paladin", an upgraded M109 howitzer. The MoD undertook studies in 2006–09 to "up-gun" the Royal Navy's main shipboard gun armament, the 4.5 inch Mark 8 naval gun, to accept 155mm ammunition from the AS-90. This would have introduced a common gun calibre for the British Army and Royal Navy, helping with ammunition logistics, and encouraging joint Army-Navy development of extended-range and precision-guided shells. The Royal Navy did not adopt this gun system.

Design
In 1963 certain NATO nations, including the UK, agreed to a "Ballistics Memorandum of Understanding" for a 155 mm 39 calibre ordnance and a baseline projectile with the shape used for the US M549 rocket-assisted shell.  The AS-90 uses a conforming 39 calibre barrel which fires the L15 unassisted projectile out to a range of 24.7 km. However, this was a new design of ordnance using a split sliding block breech with Crossley obturation, instead of the more usual screw breech, to permit bagged charges (no metal cartridge cases). The breech mechanism has a primer magazine holding 18 primers.  The standard ammunition is that designed for FH-70 (L15 HE and associated propelling charges) although in training the less effective but cheaper M107 with Green and White propelling charges is used.

It is fitted with an auxiliary power unit to eliminate the need to run the main engine to keep the batteries charged while stationary; electrical servos drive the automated elevation, traverse, magazine, shell transfer arm and loader as well as power for electronics and communications.

The vehicle is fitted with an autonomous navigation and gun laying dynamic reference unit (DRU) mounted on the trunnion. All main turret functions are controlled by a Turret Control Computer (TCC) with control and display units for the No 1 (Detachment Commander), No 2 (loader) and No 3 (layer). The combination of the DRU, TCC and powered laying controls provide autolaying.  Every gun is fitted with a radar Muzzle Velocity Measuring Device.  Reversionary mode laying uses deflection laying via the direct fire sight.

The gun can be brought into action fully closed down; the barrel can be clamped and unclamped from within the vehicle.  In-to and out-of action times are less than 1 minute.

Specifications

 Crew: 5, on board when moving (driver plus 4 gun detachment), full gun detachment 10 including driver, 4 detachment members in the turret.
 Length: 9.07 m
 Width: 3.3 m
 Height: 3.0 m
 Armour: 17 mm (maximum, steel)
 Weight: 45 tons
 Calibre: 155 mm
 Range: 24.9 km (39 cal), 30 km (52 cal) standard charges
 Rate of fire: 3 rounds in 10 seconds (burst), 6 rounds per minute for 3 minutes (intense), 2 rounds per minute for 60 minutes (sustained)
 Secondary armament: 7.62 mm L7 GPMG
 Ammunition carried: 48 projectiles and charges (31 turret and 17 hull), 1000 MG rounds
 Main engine: Cummins VTA903T 660 bhp 90 degree V8, 4 stroke, liquid cooled, turbo  diesel
 Max speed: 55 km/h (Road)
 Vehicle range: 370 km or 231 mi (Road)
 Ground clearance: 0.41 m; Gradient: 60°; Vertical obstacle: 0.75 m; Trench crossing: 2.8 m; Fording depth: 1.5 m

Variants

AS-90D
Modified for desert use. Thermal protection for crew and extra cooling for engine and machinery. Tracks adapted for reduced wear in sandy conditions.

AS-90 "Braveheart"
Basically the AS-90, but fitted with the 52 calibre length gun. This project was terminated due to non-compliant propellant charges.

Armatohaubica "Krab" – ("Cannon-howitzer crab")
Licensed "Braveheart" turret on a South Korean K9 Thunder SPG chassis, with modern "Azalia" BMS. Designed and integrated in Poland, by Huta Stalowa Wola and WB Electronics. Two Krab prototypes were built in 2001, and successfully completed all required evaluations and state acceptance trials. Initial serial production started in 2008, with eight units delivered to Polish Land Forces for testing. In 2014 production of Krab chassis was forwarded to Samsung Techwin, which will provide 120 units, replacing Polish built UPG chassis in serial vehicles.

Operators

 British Army – Royal Artillery
 1st Regiment Royal Horse Artillery.
 19th Regiment Royal Artillery.

Future operators

30 AS-90 promised by the United Kingdom on 14 January 2023. The Ukrainian Armed Forces already operate several Krab vehicles, an AS-90 variant.

See also
 Panzerhaubitze 2000, German 155mm artillery from Rheinmetall in service since 1998
 M109 howitzer
 Type 99 155 mm self-propelled howitzer
 G6 howitzer – a South African 155mm self-propelled howitzer from Denel land systems

References

Self-propelled howitzers of the United Kingdom
Self-propelled artillery of the Cold War
155 mm artillery
Tracked self-propelled howitzers
Military vehicles introduced in the 1990s